Commerce Bank Field at Foley Stadium is a historic sports venue in Worcester, Massachusetts. It was built in 1927 and was renovated in 2007. It is primarily a stadium used for high school football teams in the city and is owned and operated by the City of Worcester.

References

1927 establishments in Massachusetts
American football venues in Massachusetts
High school football venues in the United States
Soccer venues in Massachusetts
Sports venues completed in 1927
Sports venues in Worcester, Massachusetts
Worcester Hydra